Dangerous Games is a 2017 political-thriller romance novel by author Danielle Steel. The book centers on 39-year-old Alix Phillips, a television reporter who is investigating claims made against the Vice President of the United States. The novel has an international setting and takes place in cities across the world, including a chapter which takes place in New Delhi, India.

The novel made it onto the Los Angeles Times Best Sellers List  and peaked at No. 2 on the New York Times Best Sellers List.

Plot

Alix Phillips is a single mother who was widowed at age 20 and has a 19-year-old daughter, Faye. Now that her daughter is in college, Alix is able to take on lengthier and more dangerous assignments. Alix sets out to expose government corruption, and ends up embarking on an international journey. While uncovering the political underworld, she falls for her cameraman, Ben Chapman, who is an ex-Navy Seal. They uncover secrets of the past mixed with love.

Reception

Pam Norfolk of the Lancashire Post called the book a “page-turning political thriller, a gripping story of corruption, ambition, power and international intrigue.”

References

Novels by Danielle Steel
2017 American novels
Political thriller novels
Delacorte Press books